Belize is a country on the eastern coast of Central America bordered on the north by Mexico, on the south and west by Guatemala, and on the east by the Caribbean Sea. Belize has a small, mostly private enterprise economy that is based primarily on export of petroleum and crude oil, agriculture, agro-based industry, and merchandising, with tourism and construction recently assuming greater importance. The country is also a producer of industrial minerals. In agriculture, sugar, like in colonial times, remains the chief crop, accounting for nearly half of exports, while the banana industry is the  largest employer.

Notable firms 
This list includes notable companies with primary headquarters located in the country. The industry and sector follow the Industry Classification Benchmark taxonomy. Organizations which have ceased operations are included and noted as defunct.

See also

References 

Belize